St Martin-in-the-Fields was a civil parish in the metropolitan area of London, England. It took its name from the church of St Martin-in-the-Fields and was within the Liberty of Westminster. It included within its boundaries the former extra-parochial areas of Buckingham Palace and St James's Palace.

Adjustments
It was an ancient parish. In 1542 it gained most of what became its final form "lands between the church of St Clement Danes and the Palace of Westminster" from the parish of Westminster St Margaret.

It originally included four other areas, carved out as new parishes. It originally amounted to the area in green on the map, the whole Liberty, except for the part of St Margarets which formed Knightsbridge (the far west) and the part of St Clement Danes and St Mary le Strand within the ancient Liberty, very small areas north of the Strand (in the Liberty's extreme east):  The four daughter parishes were, with their year of inception:-

Poor law
It was a single parish for poor law following the Poor Law Amendment Act 1834 until 1868 when it became part of the Strand Poor Law Union.

Reform
In 1855 the parish vestry became a local authority within the area of responsibility of the Metropolitan Board of Works.

Under the Metropolis Management Act 1855 any parish that exceeded 2,000 ratepayers was to be divided into wards; as such the incorporated vestry of St Martin in the Fields was divided into three wards (electing vestrymen): No. 1 (12), No. 2 (12) and No. 3 (12).

In 1896 as its population had increased the incorporated vestry was re-divided into three new wards (electing vestrymen): Park (15), Long Acre (12) and Embankment (9).

In 1889 the parish became part of the County of London and in 1900 it became part of the Metropolitan Borough of Westminster. The St Martin in the Fields Vestry was replaced by Westminster City Council and the vestry hall became Westminster City Hall.

The civil parish was abolished in 1922.

References

History of the City of Westminster
History of local government in London (pre-1855)
Parishes governed by vestries (Metropolis)
Former civil parishes in London
1922 disestablishments in England
Bills of mortality parishes